The East Slavic languages constitute one of three regional subgroups of the Slavic languages, distinct from the West and South Slavic languages. East Slavic languages are currently spoken natively throughout Eastern Europe, and eastwards to Siberia and the Russian Far East. In part due to the large historical influence of the Russian Empire and the Soviet Union, the Russian language is also spoken as a lingua franca in many regions of Caucasus and Central Asia. Of the three Slavic branches, East Slavic is the most spoken, with the number of native speakers larger than the Western and Southern branches combined.  

The common consensus is that Belarusian, Russian and Ukrainian are the existent East Slavic languages; Rusyn is mostly considered as a separate language too, but some classify it as a dialect of Ukrainian.

The East Slavic languages descend from a common predecessor, the language spoken in the medieval Kievan Rus' (9th to 13th centuries), the Rus' language  which later evolved into Ruthenian, the language of the Grand Duchy of Lithuania (13th to 18th centuries) in the Dnieper river valley, and into Russian, the language of the Grand Duchy of Moscow (13th to 16th centuries) in the Volga river valley accordingly. All these languages use the Cyrillic script, but with particular modifications. Belarusian and Ukrainian, which are descendants of Ruthenian, have a tradition of using Latin-based alphabets—the Belarusian Łacinka and Ukrainian Latin alphabets, respectively (also Rusyn uses Latin in some regions).

Classification

Differentiation
The East Slavic territory exhibits a linguistic continuum with many transitional dialects. Between Belarusian and Ukrainian there is the Polesian dialect, which shares features from both languages. East Polesian is a transitional variety between Belarusian and Ukrainian on one hand, and between South Russian and Ukrainian on the other hand. At the same time, Belarusian and Southern Russian form a continuous area, making it virtually impossible to draw a line between the two languages. Central or Middle Russian (with its Moscow sub-dialect), the transitional step between the North and the South, became a base for the Russian literary standard. Northern Russian with its predecessor, the Old Novgorod dialect, has many original and archaic features. Due to the influence of the Polish–Lithuanian Commonwealth over many centuries, Belarusian and Ukrainian have been influenced in several respects by Polish, a West Slavic language / Lechitic. Ruthenian, the mixed Belarusian-Ukrainian literary language with a Church Slavonic substratum and Polish adstratum, was, together with Middle Polish, an official language in Belarus and Ukraine until the end of the 18th century.

Orthography

Phonology

Notes

History

When the common Old East Slavic language became separated from the ancient Slavic tongue common to all Slavs is difficult to ascertain, though in the 12th century the common language of Rus' is still referred to in contemporary writing as Slavic.

Therefore, a crucial differentiation has to be made between the history of the East Slavic dialects and that of the literary languages employed by the Eastern Slavs. Although most ancient texts betray the dialect their author or scribe spoke, it is also clearly visible that they tried to write in a language different from their dialects and to avoid those mistakes that enable us nowadays to locate them.

In both cases one has to keep in mind that the history of the East Slavic languages is of course a history of written texts.

Influence of Church Slavonic
After the conversion of the East Slavic region to Christianity the people used service books borrowed from Bulgaria, which were written in Old Church Slavonic (a South Slavic language). The Church Slavonic language was strictly used only in text, while the colloquial language of the Bulgarians was communicated in its spoken form.

Throughout the Middle Ages (and in some way up to the present day) there existed a duality between the Church Slavonic language used as some kind of 'higher' register (not only) in religious texts and the popular tongue used as a 'lower' register for secular texts. It has been suggested to describe this situation as diglossia, although there do exist mixed texts where it is sometimes very hard to determine why a given author used a popular or a Church Slavonic form in a given context. Church Slavonic was a major factor in the evolution of modern Russian, where there still exists a "high stratum" of words that were imported from this language.

See also
 Outline of Slavic history and culture

References

Further reading

External links